Salem is a municipality in the comarca of Vall d'Albaida in the Valencian Community, Spain.

References

Municipalities in the Province of Valencia
Vall d'Albaida